{{Infobox person
| name               = Yangdup Lama
| image              = Yangdup Lama.jpg
| alt                = 
| caption            = Lama in his new bar Sidecar, Delhi
| birth_name         = Yangdup Lama
| birth_date         = 
| birth_place        = Gayabari, Darjeeling, India
| death_date         = 
| death_place        = 
| nationality        = Indian
| other_names        = 
| occupation         = Mixologist, bartender, entrepreneur, author
| years_active       = 1995 - Present
| known_for          = * Sidecar: Top 50 bars in Asia
 Drinks International Magazine: 100 most influential people in the beverage industry
 India attaché by Tales of the Cocktail New Orleans
 Indian Bartender of the Year 1996
 Indian Bartender of the year 1997 under 30
 American Whiskey Ambassador India 2017 by the Distilled Spirits Council of the United States (DISCUS)
 Cocktails & Dreams/Thirsty Three Hospitality (bar service and beverage consultancy) 
 Cocktails & Dreams Speakeasy (beverage bar)
 Cocktail and Dreams Beverage Studio (school of bar and beverage management and training)
| notable_works      = Cocktails & Dreams: The Ultimate Indian Cocktail Book
}}

Yangdup Lama is bartender, bar-owner, entrepreneur, author and mixologist based in India and is known to be one of India's finest mixologists.

Lama has been featured by drinks international magazine in the Bar World 100 list of most influential people in the global beverage industry 2020, the first Indian to feature on this list. This follows the feat of having his bar Sidecar win a coveted spot as India's best bar in 2021 and the Asia's 50 Best Bars awards 2020 and 2021 and the Joint Nikka Highest Climber Award 2021.

 Early life 
Lama is the second child born to mother Kamala Lama (Sherpa) and father Late Namgal Lama (Yonzon) in the village of Gayabari near Kurseong in the hill district of Darjeeling in the North Eastern part of India. He completed Secondary School Certification (Class 10th) from Victoria Boys’ School, Kuseong and Senior School Certification (Class 12th) from Army Public School Bengdubi.

Lama moved to Kolkata in 1992 to study Hotel Management after completion of which he moved to Delhi in 1995.

 Career 

 Sidecar 
Lama is the co-owner of India's best cocktail bar Sidecar (Lama's second bar) in Greater Kailash, New Delhi in 2018.  Sidecar continues to grow in prominence on the Asian cocktail map and in 2021is named the joint Nikka Highest Climber after rising twenty-four places in the list of Asia's 50 Best Bars since 2020, number 16 in Asia and 4th in world.

In 2020 the William Reed Group ranked Sidecar amongst the top 50 bars in Asia making it the only bar in India to feature in the list.

 Cocktails & Dreams/Thirsty Three Hospitality 
After serving in Hyatt for four and a half years, Yangdup founded a mobile bar tending service company called Cocktails & Dreams and in September 2003, Cocktails & Dreams/Thirsty Three Hospitality – a bar service and beverage consultancy company. Later he opened a commercial bar called Cocktails & Dreams, Speakeasy in Gurugram (Gurgaun) and also a bar training and beverage management  school by the name Cocktail and Dreams Beverage Studio'' in Delhi.

Polo Lounge, Hyatt Regency Delhi 
Lama joined the Hyatt Regency Delhi as a food and beverage server in the year 1995 where he took to bar tending and worked at the prestigious Polo Lounge bar in the hotel.

Awards and accolades 

 Sidecar-  The Best Bar in India 2021
Sidecar 2021- Joint Nikka Highest Climber after rising 24 places in the list of Asia's 50 Best Bars since 2020.
SIdecar- Asia's 50 Best Bars 2020
 Drinks International Magazine- 2020 list: 100 most influential people in the beverage industry globally
 Indian Bartender of the Year 1999
The Asia-Pacific 30 under 30 Award 1997.
India attaché by Tales of the Cocktail New Orleans for the years 2017–18
American Whiskey Ambassador India 2017 by Distilled Spirits Council of United States.(DISCUS)

Books 
Cocktails & Dreams: The Ultimate Indian Cocktail Book

References

External links 
Cocktails and Dreams Speakeasy official website
Cocktails and Dreams bar tending school official website
Yangdup Lama TEDx talk
Metro News, Zee News
Yangdup Lama, CNBC Young Turks
Top Chef Awards 2015 Season 2
Master Yangdup Lama speech at Mixology & Flair Camp 2015 - Flairology
Yangdup lama in Hyderebad 2007
Indian Food Entrepreneur - Passion for Food - Yangdup Lama - Food Moments - Food first

Bartenders
20th-century Indian people
21st-century Indian people
People from Darjeeling district
Indian businesspeople
Bartending
Catering and food service companies of India
Sherpa people